The Magic Door is a 2007 British fantasy film directed by Paul Matthews, starring Jenny Agutter, Mick Walter,  Patsy Kensit and Anthony Head.

The film was dubbed into German and issued under the title 
Das Imperium der Elfen ("The Empire of the Elves").

Outline
Sally and Liam, a brother and sister, played by siblings Alix and Liam Matthews, run away from home to escape from their new stepmother, Rachel (Patsy Kensit), and make friends with Raglin, a troll (Mick Walter). They help him to find a magic door which will take him home to Fairyland. Once there, they need to defeat Raglin's bitter enemy the Black Witch (Jenny Agutter).

Reception
A Common Sense Media review is headed "Mild scares in confusing U.K. fantasy movie" and complains that 

When the film was released on DVD in October 2012, The Dove Foundation was unable to recommend it, as one character "damns" another, and it also noted "Sex: Husband kisses wife on forehead."

Cast
Jenny Agutter as Black Witch 
Patsy Kensit as Rachel 
Anthony Head as George 
Mick Walter as Raglin 
Liam Matthews as Liam 
Alix Matthews as Sally
Emma Ford as Fairy Princess 
Rebecca Chesney as Fairy
Lorna Rose Harris as Fairy
Faye McNaught as Fairy
Sarah Hulme as Police Constable  
Aaron Taylor-Johnson as Flip 
Tom Petherham as Police Inspector

Crew
Paul Matthews, director and screenwriter
Janet Blandford, executive producer
Patricia Chesney, producer
Peter Matthews, producer
Mark Thomas, original music
Peter Moseley, cinematographer
Richard J. Thomas, film editor
Edward Thomas, production designer
Stephen Nicholas, art director
Laura Thomas, costume designer

References

External links
The Magic Door, IMDb
The Magic Door (full movie), YouTube

2007 films
British children's fantasy films
2000s English-language films
Films directed by Paul Matthews
2000s British films